Kyle Schmid (born August 3, 1984) is a Canadian actor, best known for his roles as Alex Caulder in History's Six, Henry Durham in Syfy's Being Human, Robert Morehouse in BBC America's Copper and Aaron Abbot in The Covenant (2006). Recently, he starred as Moses in the Netflix science fiction miniseries The I-Land. In 2021, Schmid had a recurring role on ABC's television drama Big Sky.

Early life
Schmid was born in Mississauga, Ontario. He played on the Erin Mills soccer team, and attended Port Credit Secondary School in Mississauga, Ontario.

Career
Schmid is perhaps best known for his starring role as 470-year-old vampire Henry Fitzroy on Lifetime's supernatural drama series Blood Ties, and for his recurring role as Aidan Waite's vampire progeny Henry on the Syfy series Being Human. He also starred as Robert Morehouse in the BBC America drama series Copper.

He has appeared in several films, such as The Covenant, A History of Violence, The Sisterhood of the Traveling Pants, The Pacifier, and Zerophilia. He is also recognizable for playing the love interest of Raven-Symoné's character, Galleria, in Disney Channel's The Cheetah Girls.

In October 2018, it was announced that Schmid was cast in the main role of Moses on the Netflix science fiction miniseries The I-Land. The miniseries was released on September 12, 2019.

In January 2021, Schmid was added to the cast of the ABC drama Big Sky as recurring character John Wayne Kleinsasser.

Personal life
In May 2022, via his Instagram profile, Schmid announced that he and actress Caity Lotz are engaged.

Filmography

Film

Television

Awards

References

External links

 Kyle Schmid at BloodTiesCentral.com

1984 births
Living people
20th-century Canadian male actors
21st-century Canadian male actors
Male actors from Ontario
Canadian male child actors
Canadian male film actors
Canadian male television actors
People from Mississauga